Desmond Barel Hirshfield, Baron Hirshfield (17 May 1913 - 6 December 1993) was a British accountant and trade union adviser.

Born in Birmingham, to a Jewish dentist and a music hall performer, Hirshfield was educated at eight schools, including the City of London School. He became a chartered accountant, senior partner of a firm (Hesketh, Hardy & Hirshfield), and was investment advisor to the Trade Union Congress advising unionists like Frank Cousins and Vic Feather. In 1951 he married Bronia Eisen. From the 1950s he became the consultant of leading Labour Party figures such as Herbert Morrison, Nye Bevan and Harold Wilson. He was the founder and Chairman of the Trades Union Unit Trust Managers Ltd. from 1961 to 1983. He was President of the accounting firm Horwath & Horwath International between 1977 and 1984, and its International President from 1984 to 1986. He also served as Deputy Chairman of the Northampton New Town Corporation, on the Salary Review Body and the Committee on Consumer Credit.

Hirshfield believed that capital and labour had a common interest and should act as one, and worked hard to prevent the adverse effects of new technological developments on general employment. On August 30, 1967, Hirshfield was created a life peer, as Baron Hirshfield, of Holborn in Greater London. Latterly he became President of Norwood, a Jewish orphanage charity originally based in the east end, and served on the Chevening Trust which oversaw the restoration of the house for the nation. In his time away from work he was a keen artist. He died on 6 December 1993 aged 80.

Coat of arms

References

Further reading
Godfrey Gideon, Labour's Visionary: Lord Hirshfield (Richard Cohen, 1998); with an introduction by James Callaghan

1913 births
1993 deaths
Jewish British politicians
Life peers
Life peers created by Elizabeth II